Centenary State High School is a government secondary (7-12) school at 1 Moolanda Street, Jindalee, City of Brisbane, Queensland, Australia.

It is a co-curricular, co-educational school that opened in 1999.  At that time, it catered for students in Grades 8 to 12. As of 2020, the school's enrolment stood at just over 2000 students. In January 2015, it opened its doors to students in Grade 7, which are a part of a Junior School, along with Grades 8 and 9 (with Grades 10-12 becoming the Senior School). As well, throughout 2014, the school brought Sixth Graders to the premises, who—along with Seventh Graders— participated in special faculty-based activities. Located in Jindalee, in Brisbane's western Centenary Suburbs.

History
The school's name "Centenary" comes from the Centenary  suburbs in which it is located.  In 1960, a year after the celebrations of the Centenary of Queensland, LJ Hooker announced POG that it was to create "a major satellite residential development covering 1,295 hectares and a bridge linking ... the new development with the western suburbs of Brisbane". The area was originally called the Hooker Centenary Development as well as the "Centenary Project", leading to the eventual naming of the area as the "Centenary Suburbs". The suburbs are Jindalee, Mt. Ommaney, Jamboree Heights, Middle Park, Riverhills and Westlake.

The hill-side site on which Centenary currently stands was designated as a high school site from as far back as when Jindalee was originally developed, however it remained as sparse bushland until the mid-1990s, when following strong lobbying from local residents the Queensland Government announced that it would be building a secondary school on the site. Centenary was opened in January 1999, initially catering for a limited number of grades, however this was soon expanded to accommodate Grades 8 to 12.  The public took well to the new school, and enrolment quickly jumped, largely because students would no longer have to travel to Corinda State High School or Kenmore State High School to complete high school. The school has a limited Student Leader Forum each year where students are selected as 2 School Captains and Vice Captains (Year 12 only), Junior School Captains and Junior Vice Captains (Year 9 Only), and 4 Student Leaders (Years 7, 8, 9 and, 10).

The school has a catchment area limited to the Centenary suburbs and Sinnamon Park.

Facilities
A map of facilities can be viewed here

House system

The names of each house are derived from the four roads bordering the school:
 Curragundi Road, running along the northern side of the school.
 Jarup Street, on the western side.
 Moolanda Street, on the southern side.
 Yallambee Road, on the eastern side.

Administration

Principals 
Michael (Mick)  Mickelberg (first principal)
 John Brew (School Principal)
 Angela McKay (Deputy Principal, Year 7)
 Kristin Lynch (Deputy Principal, Year 8 & International Study Tours)
 Matt McDonald (Deputy Principal, Years 9 & 12)
 Adam Richter (Deputy Principal, Years 10, 11 & International Students)
 Charmaine Macaulay (Business Manager)

= Notable staff 
 Dion Locke (Senior English Teacher)
 Sophia Jahan (Senior Biology Teacher)
 Kirsten Caruso (Senior Economics Teacher)
 Dylan Levey (Senior Ancient History Teacher)
 Philippa Kaplan (Senior Modern History Teacher)
 Mandy Kaur (Senior Chemistry Teacher)

School publications
The school newsletter is entitled Centenary Chronicle and is published monthly. The school yearbook is The Sentinel, and is available in late November to early December each year. In 2009 the school no longer sent out newsletters by post and sent them as emails.

Sports

The nickname for sports teams representing Centenary SHS became "Crocodiles" in 2002, and has been used since.  The mascot was christened "Crusha the Croc" in 2003 following a competition the previous year.  Sports played at Centenary include:
Rugby league,
Rugby union,
Soccer,
Volleyball,
Netball,
Basketball,
Australian rules football,
Field Hockey,
Tennis,
Badminton,
Chess,
Swimming, 
Athletics,
Cross country,
Gaelic Football,
Table Tennis,
Softball,
Orienteering,
Cricket, and
[[Ultimate (sport)|Ultimate Disc]].

The arts
Centenary State High School has a large arts program, which features an annual play held by students who have participated in the performance STEP (Extracurricular activities for students years 7-10) The school also has an active stage band, chamber strings as well as encouraging students who volunteer to perform for weekly assemblies. Students who participate in "Back Stage Crew" have been given the opportunity to help set up live performances, gaining experience in the field of technical production. New students are able to enter the Music and Performance Plus extension programs.

References

External links
 School Website

Public high schools in Brisbane
1999 establishments in Australia
Educational institutions established in 1999